Bloodbath is a Swedish death metal supergroup from Stockholm, formed in 1998. The band has released six full-length albums, two EPs and two DVDs depicting their performances at Wacken Open Air (in 2005) and Bloodstock Open Air (in 2010). The group consists of Martin Axenrot (ex-Opeth), Anders Nyström (Katatonia), Jonas Renkse (also Katatonia) and Nick Holmes (Paradise Lost).

History
The band named themselves after the song "Blood Bath" from the album To the Gory End by extreme metal band Cancer. The initial lineup consisted of Mikael Åkerfeldt (Opeth) on vocals, Dan Swanö (Edge of Sanity, Nightingale) on drums, Anders "Blakkheim" Nyström (Katatonia, Diabolical Masquerade) on guitar, and Jonas Renkse (Katatonia, October Tide) on bass Bloodbath released the EP Breeding Death within a year of forming, followed two years later by their debut album Resurrection Through Carnage.

In 2004, Åkerfeldt left Bloodbath, wanting to free up more time for his primary band Opeth, with Peter Tägtgren (Hypocrisy) being brought in to replace him. The lineup changed further, with Swanö switching to guitar and Martin Axenrot (Witchery, Satanic Slaughter, Opeth) filling the position of drummer. With these changes the size and subsequent scope of the band increased, expanding beyond that of what was initially only a secondary side project. The band's second full release, Nightmares Made Flesh, was released in Europe in September 2004.

In February 2005, Tägtgren left the band citing "conflicting schedules". That same year, Åkerfeldt rejoined for a single live show at Germany's Wacken Open Air on 5 August. Prior to the show the band was quoted saying that the upcoming show would be "Not only the first, but also the last gig for Bloodbath (with Mikael Åkerfeldt on vocals)";. It would later turn out to also be the last show with Swanö. In September 2005, Bloodbath began searching for a new lead singer.

In August 2006, the band announced the departure of Swanö due to musical differences, as well as Swanö being busy with other projects. They simultaneously closed the vocal auditions, announcing that no suitable singer had been found.

On 27 March 2007 the band announced that a new line-up would be unveiled, along with news that they were producing new material, to be released that summer. In August 2007, Renkse posted on the band's official forums, suggesting that work was in progress. On 30 January 2008 it was announced via the Bloodbath website that Åkerfeldt would be rejoining the line-up on vocals, along with new member Per Eriksson (ex-21 Lucifers, ex-Genocrush Ferox) on guitar. In March 2008, the EP Unblessing the Purity was released. Also released in 2008 was the Wacken live CD/DVD The Wacken Carnage. Bloodbath released their third full-length album, The Fathomless Mastery, in October 2008.

On 25 April 2011 Bloodbath released their second DVD, Bloodbath over Bloodstock, containing their performance at Bloodstock Festival 2010, as well as the 2008 performance at Party San. On 1 November 2011, during the final show of the American Opeth/Katatonia tour at Ram's Head Live in Baltimore, MD, Bloodbath performed a surprise encore after Opeth's set.

On 14 April 2012 Blakkheim announced that Åkerfeldt had officially left the group. When asked whether the new vocalist was known or not, Blakkheim was quoted saying "Oh, he's a legend!". On 16 September 2014 the band announced the new vocalist as Nick Holmes from Paradise Lost.

Members

Current members
 Anders "Blakkheim" Nyström – guitars, backing vocals (1998–present)
 Jonas "Lord Seth" Renkse – bass, backing vocals (1998–present)
 Martin "Axe" Axenrot – drums, percussion (2004–present)
 Nick "Old Nick" Holmes – lead vocals (2012–present)
Tomas "Plytet" Åkvik – guitar (2022–present; session 2017–2022)

Session members
Niklas Sandin – bass (2018–present)
Waltteri Väyrynen – drums, percussion (2018–present)

Former members
 Mikael Åkerfeldt – lead vocals (1998–2004, 2005–2012)
 Dan Swanö – drums, percussion (1998– 2004), guitars (2004–2006), backing vocals (1998– 2006)
 Per "Sodomizer" Eriksson – guitars (2007–2017)
 Peter Tägtgren – lead vocals (2004–2005)
 Joakim Karlsson – guitars (2018–2019)

Timeline

Discography

Studio albums
 Resurrection Through Carnage (2002)
 Nightmares Made Flesh (2004)
 The Fathomless Mastery (2008)
 Grand Morbid Funeral (2014)
 The Arrow of Satan Is Drawn (2018)
 Survival of the Sickest (2022)

EPs
 Breeding Death (2000)
 Unblessing the Purity (2008)

Live albums
 The Wacken Carnage (2008)
 Bloodbath over Bloodstock (2011)

References

External links
 Official website

Musical groups established in 1998
Swedish death metal musical groups
Century Media Records artists
Heavy metal supergroups
Musical groups from Stockholm
1998 establishments in Sweden
Musical quintets